Jordan Marié (born 29 September 1991) is a French professional footballer who plays as a midfielder for Ligue 2 club Dijon.

References

External links

 Jordan Marié Interview

1991 births
Living people
Association football midfielders
French footballers
Sportspeople from Épinal
Ligue 1 players
Ligue 2 players
Dijon FCO players
Footballers from Grand Est